Chandran Veyattummal (also known as Paris Chandran/ Paris V Chandran; April 30, 1956 – May 22, 2022) was born in a traditional musical family in Narikkuni, Kozhikode district of Kerala).
 
Chandran started learning music at the age of six under parents first and then under renowned gurus like Venu Nanminda and Ustad Ahemmed Hussain Khan. Adept at percussion, string instruments, wind instruments, keyboard and reed instruments, he became a music composer. Since 1982, he has been giving background scores for theatrical productions, films and documentaries. He has won Kerala State Film Awards for best background score for the film Bioscope in 2008. He was a disciple of Njaralath Rama Pothuval, Theyyanasan, Kunnamkulam Kelu Asaan.

As musician

{| class="wikitable sortable"
|- "
! Year !! Title !!Film  !! Language !!Singer !! Credit 
|-
| 2007|| Chenthaasaayakaa || Drishtantham || Malayalam  || Margi Sathi || Composer
|-
| 2007|| Devi || Drishtantham || Malayalam  || Pathanapuram Jose|| Composer
|-
| 2007 || Enthaanu Vallabhaa  || Drishtantham|| Malayalam  || Margi Sathi || Composer
|-
| 2007 || Mudiyettam (Daarikavadham) || Drishtantham || Malayalam  || Pathanapuram Jose|| Composer
|-
| 2007 || Nalla samayamithu || Drishtantham || Malayalam  || Margi Sathi || Composer
|-
| 2007 || Onnukandotte ||Drishtantham || Malayalam  || KV Selin|| Composer
|-
| 2007 || Paayeedum Thampuraane || Drishtantham || Malayalam  || Sreenivasan Veyattummal || Composer
|-
| 2007 || Rosham Undaakkuvan || Drishtantham || Malayalam  ||Margi Sathi || Composer
|-
| 2007 || Varanund Varanund || Drishtantham || Malayalam  || Sreenivasan Veyattummal || Composer
|-
| 2010 || Meera  || Bombay Mittayi ||Malayalam  || G. Venugopal || Composer
|-
| 2010 || 'Himagiri  || Bombay Mittayi ||Malayalam  || K. J. Yesudas & Jos Sagar|| Composer
|-
| 2010 || Mannum Ponnayi  || Bombay Mittayi || Malayalam  || Midhu Vincent, Vidhu Prathap, Ravisankar, Geetha Jith|| Composer
|-
| 2010 || Meerathan  || Bombay Mittayi||Malayalam  || K. S. Chithra || Composer
|-
| 2010 || Kochukuttiyepole || Bombay Mittayi || Malayalam  || Pradeep Palluruthy|| Composer
|-
| 2011 || Sarika || Nakharam || Malayalam  || Traditional|| Composer
|-
| 2011 || Rama Rama || Nakharam  || Malayalam  || Traditional|| Composer
|-
| 2011 || Melukovayya ||Nakharam || Malayalam  || Traditional|| Composer
|-
| 2014 || Ambilippoovukal || Chayilyam || Malayalam  || Sithara (singer), Nakhasi Shivadas|| Composer
|-
| 2013 || Kannottam Ennum || Bioscope || Malayalam  || Anil Ram|| Composer
|-
| 2013 || Mannuyirellam  || Bioscope || Malayalam  || Anil Ram|| Composer
|-
| 2014 || Pokaruthen Makane   || Njan Steve Lopez || Malayalam  || Jency|| Composer
|-
| 2016 || Chillu Chillu Chillakal || Amoeba || Malayalam  || Haritha Hareesh|| Composer
|-
| 2017 || Maarivil Maayanu || Eeda || Malayalam  || Sithara (singer)|| Composer
|-
| 2022 || (BGM) || Antharam || Malayalam  || -- || Background Score
|-
|}

In Theatre
 Composed and played for SENDERS, a play by Strindberg directed by Anuradha Kapoor at the venue of World Social forum in Kenya, East Africa.
 2005–2006	Composed and played for Drama Merchant of Venice staged by Tara Arts, London.
 2004–2005	Composed and played for BABARNAMA, a collaborative attempt by Japan Foundation, Tokyo.
 1995–2002	Composed and played for the theatrical productions of Foots Barn traveling theatre France
 1989–1991	Composed and played for a few productions at ROYAL NATIONAL THEATRE, South Bank, London
 1988–1989 Composed and played for a radio play titled THE MANSOON, a BBC telecast
 1986–1988	Composed and played for the productions of TARA ARTS LONDON 
 1982–1985	Composed and played music for the productions of Calicut University Little Theatre (CULT)
 2009 – Palangal
 2017 – Khazakibte itihasam 
 2016 – Talatum tempest
 2016 – Ekantham
 2016 – Kaali 
 2019 – Dark things

Awards

Kerala State Film Awards for best background score for the film Bioscope
 Kerala State Television Award for best music director tele film Pranayathil Oruval''  in 2010

References

External links
 

People from Kozhikode district
Kerala State Film Award winners
Film musicians from Kerala
21st-century Indian composers
Malayalam film score composers
1956 births
2022 deaths